Gumaga is a genus of bushtailed caddisflies in the family Sericostomatidae. There are about six described species in Gumaga.

The type species for Gumaga is Gumaga okinawaensis M. Tsuda.

Species
These six species belong to the genus Gumaga:
 Gumaga griseola (McLachlan, 1871)
 Gumaga hesperus (Banks, 1914)
 Gumaga nigra (Mosely, 1938)
 Gumaga nigricula (McLachlan, 1871)
 Gumaga orientalis (Martynov, 1935)
 Gumaga quyeni Malicky, 1995

References

Further reading

 
 
 
 

Trichoptera genera
Integripalpia